Polvere di stelle  (Stardust) is a 1973 Italian film which was directed by Alberto Sordi. It starred Alberto Sordi and Monica Vitti.

Plot
Mimmo Adami and Dea Dani are local professional dancers in the impoverished Italy of the Second World War. Their lives change suddenly as American soldiers stop in their town hoping to be entertained in accordance with the Broadway style. Effectively, they perform up to their expectations. However, as the army men have to march northward, the moment of glory of Mimmo and Dea finishes heartlessly.

Cast

Alberto Sordi: Mimmo Adami
Monica Vitti: Dea Dani
John Phillip Law: John 
Edoardo Faieta: Don Ciccio Caracioni
Wanda Osiris: Herself
Carlo Dapporto: Himself
Franco Angrisano:  Fascist Party Secretary
Franca Scagnetti: Don Ciccio's Aunt

Awards
 1974 David di Donatello award for Best Actress: Monica Vitti

External links

1970 films
1970 comedy films
1970s Italian-language films
Films directed by Alberto Sordi
Films scored by Piero Piccioni
Films set in Italy
Films set in Rome
Films shot in Rome
Films set in 1943
Films set in 1944
Italian Campaign of World War II films
Films with screenplays by Ruggero Maccari
Italian comedy films
1970s Italian films